Moustapha Fall (born 23 February 1992) is a French professional basketball player for Olympiacos of the Greek Basket League and the EuroLeague. Standing at 2.18 m (7 ft 2 in), Fall plays at the center position.

Professional career
Fall played in the French League from 2011 to 2017. In the 2015–16 season, he played for Olympique Antibes where he led the French league in blocked shots. He signed with Élan Chalon for the 2016–17 season. This season, Chalon won the Pro A which was Fall's first national title. In addition, Fall played in the FIBA Europe Cup Final with Chalon, where his team lost to Nanterre 92. He was named Top Performer of the Final by the FIBA Europe Cup.

Prior to the start of the French season, Fall participated in the 2016 NBA Summer League in Las Vegas with the Los Angeles Lakers.

On 13 July 2017 Fall signed with Turkish club Sakarya BB.

On 26 July 2018 Fall signed with Lokomotiv Kuban of the Russian VTB United League.

On 21 July 2019 Fall signed a contract with the Türk Telekom of the Turkish Basketball Super League. In October 2020, Fall was named to the All-Basketball Champions League Second Team. 

In June 2021, Fall signed with Olympiacos of Greece. On 28 February 2022 he extended his contract with the team until 2025.

Awards and accomplishments

Club career 

Élan Chalon
 French League Champion: (2017)

ASVEL
 French League Champion: (2021)
 French Cup Winner: (2021)

Olympiacos
  Greek League Champion: (2022)
 2× Greek Cup Winner: (2022, 2023)
  Greek Super Cup Winner: (2022)

Individual
 BCL Second Team: (2020)
 French Cup Final MVP: (2021)
2× LNB Pro A Best Defender: (2017, 2021)
 All-Greek League Defensive Team: (2022)
Eurobasket.com's LNB Pro B Defensive Player of the Year : (2015)
Eurobasket.com's BSL Defensive Player of the Year: (2020)
LNB Pro A rebounding leader: (2017)
 LNB Pro B blocks leader: (2015)
 BSL blocks leader: (2020)
 Greek Super Cup MVP: (2022)
 Greek Super Cup Finals Top Scorer: (2022)

References

External links
Euroleague.net Profile
French League Profile 
TBLStat.net Profile
Eurobasket.com Profile

1992 births
Living people
AS Monaco Basket players
ASVEL Basket players
Basketball players at the 2020 Summer Olympics
Basketball players from Paris
Centers (basketball)
Élan Chalon players
French expatriate basketball people in Monaco
French expatriate basketball people in Russia
French expatriate basketball people in Turkey
French men's basketball players
Olympic basketball players of France
Olympique Antibes basketball players
PBC Lokomotiv-Kuban players
Poitiers Basket 86 players
Sakarya BB players
Türk Telekom B.K. players
Medalists at the 2020 Summer Olympics
Olympic medalists in basketball
Olympic silver medalists for France
Black French sportspeople
French people of Guadeloupean descent